The Eastern Metropolitan Bypass (known simply as both E.M. Bypass and EM Bypass) is a  (Including Kamalgazi to Baruipur extension) major road on the east side of Kolkata. It connects Ultadanga (North Kolkata) to Baruipur Puratan Bazar (South Kolkata). The road is a major link to  Salt Lake and New Town. EM Bypass is part of both State Highway 1 and State Highway 3. Much high-end construction and development in Kolkata has been centred around the Bypass.

It was designed as a six to eight-lane bypass to lessen traffic congestion on the entire stretch of Gariahat Road. Several consequent connections have been made to Gariahat Road to further move traffic to the Bypass.

History and development
The Eastern Metropolitan Bypass was constructed during the 1980s and became operational in 1982. The construction disrupted part of the East Kolkata Wetlands.

At one point in 2010 the road was officially named Jyoti Basu Sarani after Jyoti Basu. The road was further renamed Biswa Bangla Sarani by the Chief Minister Mamata Banerjee in 2011.

The road is undergoing expansion under the JNNURM.

Connectors and overpasses

A number of 'connectors' or connecting roads link the bypass to major hubs of the city all along its route. From north to south, these are:

Gallery

References

External links

 Commercial Development of E.M. Bypass

Roads in Kolkata
State Highways in West Bengal
Bypasses
Articles containing video clips